Fernand-Léonce-Émile Pelloutier (1 October 1867, in Paris – 13 March 1901, in Sèvres) was a French anarchist and syndicalist.

He was the leader of the Bourses du Travail, a major French trade union, from 1895 until his death in 1901. He was succeeded by Yvetot. In 1902, the Bourses du Travail merged with the Confédération Générale du Travail.

Pelloutier's theories were exceptionally important to the Revolutionary Syndicalism movement in Italy that appeared towards the end of the nineteenth century, and he is a source of major influence in this regard for Georges Sorel. Both saw the socialist movement as divided between those supporting the political action of parties and those supporting direct action.

Bibliography 
Jacques Julliard, Fernand Pelloutier et les origines du syndicalisme d'action directe, Paris 1971
F.F. Ridley, Revolutionary Syndicalism in France, Cambridge 1970
Peter Stearns, Revolutionary Syndicalism and French Labor: A Cause without Rebels, New Brunswick 1971
Barbara Mitchell, The Practical Revolutionaries. A New Interpretation of the French Anarchosyndicalists, New York 1987.

See also 
Anarchism in France
Bourse du travail

References 

1867 births
1901 deaths
Trade unionists from Paris
French anarchists
Members of the General Confederation of Labour (France)
Anarcho-syndicalists
Revolutionary Syndicalism